Ce'Aira Brown (born November 4, 1993) is an American middle-distance runner. Representing the United States at the 2019 World Athletics Championships, she placed 8th in the final of the women's 800 metres. Brown placed third in the 800 meters at 2019 The Match Europe v USA. Ce’aira Brown To Be Inducted into MEAC Hall of Fame in 2023.

US Championships

College
Ce'Aira Brown is a 5-time All-American, set Hampton University records indoor track and field records in 5 events: 600 metres 1:33.21, 800 metres 2:04.72, Mile 4:51.63, 1000 metres 2:51.17, 3000 metres 10:06.42 and outdoor track and field records in 3 events: 800 metres 2:02.82, 1500 metres 4:28.23, and 4x400-meter relay 3:32.30 (Tanisha Greene, Le'Quisha Parker, Ce'aira Brown, Malekah Holland).

As a Hampton Lady Pirates, Brown earned 2 NCAA Division I All-American track and field 800 meters honors (2016 NCAA Division I Indoor Track and Field Championships and 2016 NCAA Division I Outdoor Track and Field Championships). Brown scored 41 points at the 2016 MEAC Outdoor Track & Field Championships by placing in the 800 metres, 1500 metres, 5000 metres, 10,000 metres, and 4x400-meter relay. Brown won  800 m at the 2016 IC4A/ECAC Indoor Track and Field Championships. Brown scored 40 points at the 2016 MEAC Indoor Track & Field Championships after winning the 800 metres, Mile, 3000 metres and Distance medley relay.

Brown earned MEAC all-conference Mid-Eastern Athletic Conference in cross country in 2015 after placing 4th in 18:10.6. Brown won the 800 meters title at 2015 IC4A/ECAC Outdoor Track & Field Championships in 2:04.81. Brown scored 36 points at the 2015 MEAC Outdoor Track & Field Championships by winning in the 800 metres, 1500 metres, 4 x 400 m relay and placing third in the 5000 metres. Brown placed 15th in the 800 m at 2015 NCAA Division I Indoor Track and Field Championships where she earned All-American track and field 800 meters honor. Brown scored 35 points at the 2015 MEAC Indoor Track & Field Championships by winning in the 800 metres, Mile, 4 x 400 m relay and running a Personal Best time of 17:50.64 to place third in the 5000 metres.

Brown earned MEAC all-conference in cross country in 2014 when she placed 6th. Brown placed 9th in 800 meters at 2014 NCAA Division I Outdoor Track and Field Championships in 2:05.01. Brown won 3 MEAC titles at 2014 MEAC Outdoor Track & Field Championships 800 metres 2:09.14, 1500 metres 4:34.68, and 4x400-meter relay 3:38.25 and 4 MEAC titles in 2014 MEAC Indoor Track & Field Championships 800 metres, Mile, 4x400-meter relay and Distance medley relay.

As a Langston University Lion, 2013 National Association of Intercollegiate Athletics outdoor track and field championships, Brown placed 9th in the 400 metres final in 56.00. At the 2013 Red River Athletic Conference Outdoor Track & Field Championships, Brown won 400 meters, 4x400 metres relay, placed second at 1500 meters, 4x800 metres relay and 12th in the 800 metres. At the 2013 NAIA Indoor Track & Field Championships, Brown placed 11th in the 400 meters in a time of 57.80 and 5th in the 4x400 metres relay with Dearra McNeal, Lauren Corbitt, Kierra Patterson, Ce'Aira Brown in a time of 3:47.28.

High School
Brown placed 12th in the 800 meters at 2012 New Balance Indoor Nationals in 2:12.79 behind winner Ajeé Wilson and runner-up Mary Cain.

Philadelphia Public League champions from Overbrook High School track & field include Olympic & World Champion Gold Medalist Jon Drummond, Track & Field World Junior Championships Medalist & NCAA champion was her Head Coach Deworski Odom, NCAA Division I All-American Tanqueray Hayward and Toya Brown.
Brown set Overbrown HS records in 400 meters (55.59), 800 meters (2:11.01) and 4x400 meters relay.

References

External Links
 

American female middle-distance runners
1993 births
Living people
World Athletics Championships athletes for the United States
21st-century American women
Hampton University alumni